The 2020 GT World Challenge Europe Sprint Cup was the eighth season of the GT World Challenge Europe Sprint Cup following on from the demise of the SRO Motorsports Group's FIA GT1 World Championship (an auto racing series for grand tourer cars), the first after title sponsor Blancpain withdrew sponsorship. The season began on 9 August at Misano World Circuit and finished on 11 October at the Circuit de Barcelona-Catalunya. This season the GT Sports Club Europe was brought into the GT World Challenge Europe, meaning the Bronze-focused GT3 and GT2 series shared grids with the headlining series.

Calendar
The season began on 9 August at Misano and finished on 11 October at the Circuit de Barcelona-Catalunya.

Entry List

{|
|
{| class="wikitable" style="font-size: 85%;"
! Team
! Car
! 
! Drivers
! Class
! Rounds
|-
|rowspan=6|  Toksport WRT
|rowspan=6| Mercedes-AMG GT3 Evo
|rowspan=2 align="center" | 2
|  Juuso Puhakka
|rowspan=2 align=center| S
|rowspan=2| All
|-
|  Óscar Tunjo
|-
|rowspan=4 align="center" | 6
| Robin Rogalski
|rowspan=4 align=center| S
| 1–3
|-
|  Kris Heidorn
| 1
|-
|  Mick Wishofer
| 2
|-
|  Romain Monti
| 3
|-
|rowspan=2|  Haupt Racing Team
|rowspan=2| Mercedes-AMG GT3 Evo
|rowspan=2 align="center" | 4
|  Maro Engel
|rowspan=2 align=center| P
|rowspan=2| 1–2, 4
|-
|  Luca Stolz
|-
|rowspan=6|  Emil Frey Racing
|rowspan=6| Lamborghini Huracán GT3 Evo
|rowspan=4 align="center" | 14
|  Norbert Siedler
|align=center rowspan=2| P
|rowspan=2| 1–3
|-
|rowspan=2|  Mikaël Grenier
|-
|rowspan=2 align=center| S
|rowspan=2| 4
|-
|  Ricardo Feller
|-
|rowspan=2 align="center" | 163
|  Giacomo Altoè
|rowspan=2 align=center| P
|rowspan=2| All
|-
|  Albert Costa
|-
|rowspan=2|  Tech 1 Racing
|rowspan=2| Lexus RC F GT3
|rowspan=2 align="center" | 15
|  Thomas Neubauer
|rowspan=2 align=center| S
|rowspan=2| All
|-
|  Aurélien Panis
|-
|rowspan=2|  ERC Sport
|rowspan=2| Mercedes-AMG GT3 Evo
|rowspan=2 align="center" | 18
|  Phil Keen
|rowspan=2 align=center| PA
|rowspan=2| All
|-
|  Lee Mowle
|-
|rowspan=5|  SPS Automotive Performance
|rowspan=5| Mercedes-AMG GT3 Evo
|rowspan=3 align="center" | 20
|  Valentin Pierburg
|rowspan=3 align=center| PA
| All
|-
|  Dominik Baumann
| 1–2, 4
|-
|  Nick Foster
| 3
|-
| rowspan=2 align="center" | 44
|  Christian Hook
|rowspan=2 align=center| PA
|rowspan=2| 1
|-
|  Tom Onslow-Cole
|-
|rowspan=4|  Saintéloc Racing
|rowspan=4| Audi R8 LMS Evo
|rowspan=2 align="center" | 25
|  Christopher Haase
|rowspan=2 align=center| P
|rowspan=2| All
|-
|  Arthur Rougier
|-
|rowspan=2 align="center" | 26
|  Simon Gachet
|rowspan=2 align=center| S
|rowspan=2| All
|-
|  Steven Palette
|-
|rowspan=8|  Belgian Audi Club Team WRT
|rowspan=8| Audi R8 LMS Evo
|rowspan=2 align=center| 30
|  Rik Breukers
|rowspan=2 align=center| S
|rowspan=2| 3
|-
|  Rolf Ineichen
|-
|rowspan=2 align="center" | 31
|  Kelvin van der Linde
|rowspan=2 align=center| P|rowspan=2| All
|-
|  Ryuichiro Tomita
|-
|rowspan=2 align="center" | 32
|  Dries Vanthoor
|rowspan=2 align=center| P|rowspan=2| All
|-
|  Charles Weerts
|-
|rowspan=2 align="center" | 33
|  Hamza Owega
|rowspan=2 align=center| S|rowspan=2| All
|-
|  Jusuf Owega
|-
|rowspan=2|  AF Corse
|rowspan=2| Ferrari 488 GT3
|rowspan=2 align="center" | 52
|  Andrea Bertolini
|rowspan=2 align=center| PA|rowspan=2| All
|-
|  Louis Machiels
|-
|rowspan=5|  Attempto Racing
|rowspan=5| Audi R8 LMS Evo
|rowspan=2 align="center" | 55
|  Mattia Drudi
|rowspan=2 align=center| P|rowspan=2| All
|-
|  Tommaso Mosca
|-
|rowspan=3 align="center" | 66
|  Nicolas Schöll
|rowspan=3 align=center| P| All
|-
|  Frédéric Vervisch
| 1–2, 4
|-
|  Finlay Hutchison
| 3
|-
|rowspan=5|  AKKA ASP Team
|rowspan=5| Mercedes-AMG GT3 Evo
|rowspan=3 align="center" | 88
|  Timur Boguslavskiy
|rowspan=3 align=center| P| All
|-
|  Raffaele Marciello
| 1–2, 4
|-
|  Felipe Fraga
| 3
|-
|rowspan=2 align="center" | 89
|  Benjamin Hites
|rowspan=2 align=center| S|rowspan=2| All
|-
|  Jim Pla
|-
|rowspan=2|  Madpanda Motorsport
|rowspan=2| Mercedes-AMG GT3 Evo
|rowspan=2 align="center" | 90
|  Ezequiel Pérez Companc
|rowspan=2 align=center| S|rowspan=2| All
|-
|  Axcil Jefferies
|-
|rowspan=4|  Sky - Tempesta Racing
|rowspan=4| Ferrari 488 GT3
|rowspan=2 align=center| 92
|  Giancarlo Fisichella
|rowspan=2 align=center| PA|rowspan=2| 2
|-
|  Jonathan Hui
|-
|rowspan=2 align="center" | 93
|  Eddie Cheever
|rowspan=2 align=center| PA|rowspan=2| All
|-
|  Chris Froggatt
|-
|rowspan=4|  CMR
|rowspan=4| Bentley Continental GT3
|rowspan=2 align="center" | 107
|  Jules Gounon
|rowspan=2 align=center| P|rowspan=2| All
|-
|  Nelson Panciatici
|-
|rowspan=2 align="center" | 108
|  Hugo Chevalier
|rowspan=2 align=center| S|rowspan=2| All
|-
|  Pierre-Alexandre Jean
|-
|}
|valign="top"|

|}

Race resultsBold''' indicates the overall winner.

Championship standings
Scoring system
Championship points are awarded for the first ten positions in each race. The pole-sitter also receives one point and entries are required to complete 75% of the winning car's race distance in order to be classified and earn points. Individual drivers are required to participate for a minimum of 25 minutes in order to earn championship points in any race.

Drivers' championships

Overall

Silver Cup

Pro-Am Cup

Team's championships

Overall

Silver Cup

Pro-Am Cup

See also
2020 GT World Challenge Europe
2020 GT World Challenge Europe Endurance Cup
2020 GT World Challenge Asia
2020 GT World Challenge America

References

External links

World Challenge Europe